Haplophthalmus abbreviatus is a species of woodlouse in the family Trichoniscidae. It is found in Europe & Northern Asia (excluding China).

The IUCN conservation status of Haplophthalmus abbreviatus is "VU", vulnerable. The species faces a high risk of endangerment in the medium term. The IUCN status was reviewed in 1996.

Subspecies
These two subspecies belong to the species Haplophthalmus abbreviatus:
 Haplophthalmus abbreviatus abbreviatus Verhoeff, 1928
 Haplophthalmus abbreviatus aenariensis Verhoeff, 1944

References

Isopoda
Articles created by Qbugbot
Crustaceans described in 1928